After America is an alternate history novel by Australian novelist John Birmingham and released in Australia in July 2010. It was released in the United States on 17 August 2010.

It is the middle book of a three-part series, being preceded by Without Warning in 2007 and followed up by Angels of Vengeance in 2012. The overall group is known as the Without Warning trilogy and is the author's second such multi-part work.

Plot

In 2007, four years after the "Wave" killed most of North America's population, former Seattle City Council member James Kipper is now the President of the United States. The U.S. federal government and the U.S. capital have been relocated to Seattle, and it is later revealed that roughly 15 to 20 million Americans survived the Wave and are now back in the United States. Jed Culver is now Kipper's Chief of Staff and is also a close friend. After a meeting with foreign dignitaries in Seattle, Kipper and Culver head to New York City, where salvage crews are working to clear the streets of debris, the Wave having made its victims disappear, so crew-less vehicles and aircraft crashed as a result. Due to the lack of people to maintain New York City as well as cities all over the contiguous United States, fires burned unchecked and New York City is now flooded in some areas. The U.S. military has also had to step in alongside the New York Militia to fight droves of pirates, looters, terrorists and organized gangs who have moved into the U.S. East Coast from South America, Africa, and Eastern Europe.

Julianne Balwyn and Rhino Ross are part of one of those salvage crews. While clearing streets of crashed autos, Rhino and Jules meet Kipper as he tours the salvage efforts. Kipper is suspicious of Jules, who does not seem enthused to see Kipper, whereas Rhino is excited and eager to talk. Kipper leaves them to tour more of the city and hears gunfire in the distance. Texas is now a federal mandate; since everyone there was killed, the farmland is given to immigrants for them to work in order to become naturalized U.S. citizens. Miguel Pieraro and his family own one such farm. Jackson Blackstone, the disgraced army general who was forced into retirement by Kipper after the Wave, is now the elected governor of Texas and has a xenophobic dislike of the new immigrants. As a result, he has "road agents" that go around harassing farmers. Pieraro and his daughter Sofia are out herding cattle when road agents go to his home and rape and murder his female relatives and torture and execute the males. Pieraro and Sofia kill some stragglers and bury their family; Miguel decides to leave Texas for Kansas City, which is the largest intact city in the U.S. Midwest and is therefore the industrial and governmental heart of the United States, aside from Seattle.

Caitlin Monroe and Bret Melton are now married and living in Wiltshire, United Kingdom, where they run a farm together. Monroe is still in Echelon, but is not a field agent anymore; she only reports as an adviser. She and her husband have an infant daughter named Monique, after the French activist Caitlin befriended in the aftermath of the Wave, and who died at the hands of rogue French DGSE agents working for al-Banna, the terrorist Caitlin was tracking.

In New York City, Kipper is meeting with the press at Castle Clinton when the area is hit with Katyusha rockets from Muslim fighters on Ellis Island. The U.S. Secret Service herd Kipper into protection while U.S. Army Rangers head to Ellis Island to clear it out; among them is Staff Sergeant Fryderyk Milosz, the former Polish GROM operator that met Bret Melton in Kuwait in the aftermath of the Wave. Milosz has come to the U.S. and joined the army there to become a citizen since his homeland fell apart in the aftermath. He is with Master Sergeant Wilson and two other Rangers in a Blackhawk helicopter flying to Ellis Island; they cannot get close because the enemy fire; one of their neighboring Blackhawks is shot down after an Apache launches a barrage at the teams that hit Castle Clinton.

Yusuf Mohammed, a Ugandan teenager who was snatched up for service in the Emir's forces from the Lord's Resistance Army, is with a number of Ugandan, Ethiopian and Somali fighters when they launch the rockets at Castle Clinton; they are all killed by the Apache attack, leaving Yusuf as the only survivor. He meets another group of jihadist fighters, and they shoot down the Blackhawk next to Milosz's bird. Yusuf's men are killed but he jumps into the water and drifts away.

Milosz, Wilson and their team fast rope into Ellis Island and clear it out, where they capture some of the fighters. Milosz sees U.S. Navy SEALs, Sandline mercenaries, and teams from the National Intelligence Agency, which replaced the CIA after the Wave, taking away the prisoners.

Jules and Rhino reveal that they are in New York City only to pursue paperwork at an apartment in Lower Manhattan that belongs to the "Client", someone in Seattle who is after oil deposits off the Californian coast; the paperwork would indicate his pre-Wave ownership over the oil fields and therefore give him government backing to drill again. Rhino and Jules are waiting for the right time to leave so they can get the papers and get paid.

Yusuf drifts up the Hudson River to Pier 86, where he sees a decrepit  sitting at the pier in storms and floods; all of the aircraft have fallen off the flight deck and onto the barge next to the carrier, destroying the Intrepid Sea, Air & Space Museum. Yusuf is in territory controlled by the Russian and Serbian Mafia, so he comes ashore and sneaks through the territory to reach the Emir's compound and give them information.

Kipper refuses evacuation because some of his military and Secret Service staff are wounded; in Texas, Pieraro and Sofia vow vengeance against the road agents; and in England, Bret Melton and Monique are ambushed by assassins, which Caitlin kills, save for one named Richardson. Caitlin travels to London with Dalby, an agent with Echelon, who tells her they are going to interrogate Richardson and find out why they were trying to kill Caitlin and her family. In New York, Jules and Rhino escape their hotel after it is attacked by a mass of irregular fighters; Kipper learns that they cannot evacuate to JFK Airport because the U.S. Air Force Security Forces there are in the middle of a pitched battle with irregulars, and Sandline, Special Forces and troopers of the 1st Cavalry Division are trying to clear the airport.

Lieutenant Colonel Kinninmore, an officer with the S-2 section of the 1st Cavalry Division, briefs Kipper on what his soldiers have found; while most fighters kill themselves with suicide bombs to prevent capture, they have secured some low-level pirates who tell his men that the Emir, a mysterious Arabian man, came to New York City six months previously from Morocco and promised all the Muslim fighters New York City if they helped fight the U.S.; the Emir bought off rival gangs and promised them territory outside of New York, but the Russian and Serbian Mafia groups turn them down. Kinninmore also reveals that the Katyusha rockets and Type 56 rifles they have lifted from the dead are brand-new and originated in Pakistan and Yemen, which are now hotbeds for terrorist activity. Kipper is evacuated aboard Marine One, a VH-71 Kestrel helicopter which the Royal Air Force gave to the United States as part of a Lend-Lease agreement that the British and the U.S. have in place. As they are flown out, Kipper is told about Blackstone's antics in Texas and how the Pieraro family are the latest victims of the road agent problem; Kipper demands that they do something about it.

Caitlin and Dalby travel to Salisbury Plain, where Richardson is interrogated by Echelon agents; it is revealed that al-Banna hired him and his crew to kill Caitlin and her family. Caitlin is ordered to London to prepare to fly to Germany, where al-Banna's mother lives. The British military at Salisbury Plain is now equipped with Abrams tanks, Bradley Fighting Vehicles, C-17 transports, M-16 rifles, and other surplus U.S. military gear that was given to them; it is revealed that the British have a base in Norfolk, Virginia and that their Royal Navy is interdicting pirate ships in the Atlantic Ocean since the U.S. Navy is much smaller and less capable than it used to be.

Miguel Pieraro and Sofia meet two Mormon cattle herders, Willem D'Age and Cooper Aronson, who have left their main group, including their wives and children, behind in order to get their herd north to Kansas City. Pieraro reveals to them what happened with his family; later it is discovered that Aronson's group was kidnapped by road agents as sex slaves. As revenge for his own loss and to help his new friends, Pieraro vows vengeance against the road agents.

Kipper flies to Kansas City and receives a brief via teleconference from General Tommy Franks, his new Chairman of the Joint Chiefs of Staff. Kipper learns that the situation in New York is deteriorating and that Franks is requesting more troops to quell the pirates in New York; Kipper asks Culver if the U.S. has any neutron bombs to take them out while sparing the infrastructure. Admiral James Ritchie, now in charge of America's deterrent forces, is overseeing the transfer of Ohio-class ballistic missile submarines to Australia when he receives the call; he tells Kipper that the neutron bombs were destroyed in the 1990s, and that chemical and biological weapons are out of the question because they were in the process of being demilled when the Wave hit. Culver tries to persuade Kipper to give strategic bombers the order to strike New York City, but Kipper is reluctant to destroy American infrastructure, and hesitates. At this time it is revealed that in 2003, Russia launched nuclear strikes against three unnamed former Soviet republics, and that India and Pakistan fought a war in 2005 which resulted in the nuclear destruction of both nations; the death toll from that war rose to 200 million, while people continue to die from the "Second Holocaust", the Israeli nuclear strike on the Middle East; casualties from that war now exceed 600 million.

In New York City, Lieutenant Colonel Kinninmore assigns Master Sergeant Wilson and Staff Sergeant Milosz two U.S. Air Force Combat Controllers, Technical Sergeant Bonnie Gardener and Staff Sergeant Veal, so that they can go into enemy territory and call air strikes on enemy positions, including the rockets that are claiming more and more of the army's helicopters. While the Ranger fire team slugs it out with the enemy in Lower Manhattan, Jules and Rhino fight across Union Square. In Texas, Pieraro learns that Aronson and D'Age have night vision goggles, and they locate a bar where the road agents are keeping the Mormon women. They plot to attack at night. While Caitlin prepares to travel to London to prepare for Berlin, Kipper thinks about how to deal with New York; Yusuf makes it to the Emir's compound and tells them what he has seen, prompting the Emir to think Yusuf as a brave warrior. The Emir permits Yusuf to stay with his harem as a reward.

Milosz, Wilson, Gardener and Veal engage pirates in a ferocious firefight, during which Veal is killed by a grenade blast. They run into Jules and Rhino, who save them from being overrun after killing many of the pirates and forcing them to retreat. Master Sergeant Wilson initially wants them to turn in their weapons because they are fleeing their place of work, but Milosz is open to helping them when Jules offers them a piece of the share once they get paid by the Client. Even though Wilson is upset, Milosz calls in a Blackhawk, which flies the Rangers and Jules and Rhino to a staging area outside of Central Park.

In Texas, Pieraro and the Mormons assault the bar and kill most of the road agents, rescuing the Mormon women and executing the survivors as punishment for their crimes against the Mormons and anyone else. Pieraro learns that his daughter used a Remington 700 sniper rifle to cover the attack and therefore save his life even though he told her to leave for safety; he is proud of her and they bond over the moment.

Yusuf is given command of his own team by the Emir for his services, and is tasked with infiltrating past Union Square to push the Americans back. In Kansas City, Kipper comes to a decision and orders Culver to mobilize the bombers for a fire bombing run on New York City, which would break the will of the fighters and kill a large number of them. In Berlin, Caitlin locates Fabia Shah, al-Banna's mother. Germany has become a Muslim enclave since the Wave, and certain areas of Germany, including Berlin, allow Sharia Law; the German government does not interfere with Muslim affairs, and is open to their way of life even after the UK forcibly deported its entire Muslim population and France did the same after its intifada. Caitlin meets Sayad al-Mirsaad, Bret's al-Jazeera friend, and al-Mirsaad helps her get to Fabia's apartment. She interrogates her and discovers that al-Banna is in New York City, and that he is 'the Emir'. She is ambushed by Fabia's bodyguards, but kills many of them before Dalby rescues her.

Kipper visits the North Kansas City Hospital, which has become the main military medical center for wounded personnel. He personally pins the Purple Heart and other medals on the pillows of wounded personnel and takes the responsibility of writing letters to the deceased personnel, because he feels guilty over making decisions that sent soldiers and Marines to their deaths.

In Palestine, Texas Pieraro and the Mormons find burned out settlements where road agents had been, and where they had killed men, women and children. Pieraro takes photos of the scene for evidence to give to the FBI, which is now headquartered in Kansas City, while the Mormons administer last rites to the dead and bury them in cairns.

Kipper receives another brief from Franks, who requests more troops; Kipper authorizes the redeployment of the 3rd Marine Expeditionary Brigade to New York City, along with elements of the 101st Airborne Division; the 1st Cavalry Division, 3rd Infantry Division, 82nd Airborne Division, 2nd Marine Expeditionary Brigade, and elements of Sandline and SOCOM are already on the ground slugging it out with the irregulars. The 3rd MEB has to leave MCRD San Diego, which has become the headquarters and main garrison for the U.S. Marine Corps after the Wave.

In Texas, Pieraro and the Mormons settle in an abandoned house and talk about what they were doing when the Wave hit; Roberto Morales, Pieraro's old ranch hand and a nemesis during the Wave, is now a dictator in charge of the new South American Federation, which was formed from all the countries of Central and South America after the Wave. While Blackstone hassles immigrants with his road agents, Morales is a constant threat to Blackstone, which keeps him from alienating the federal government too much.

Yusuf and his team attack the Americans but are pushed back; the survivors perform a tactical retreat when Yusuf decides that they cannot win in a standup fight. Caitlin is meanwhile on her way to New York City from Berlin aboard an MC-130H, with orders to rendition al-Banna from New York; she is briefed by Kipper, but tells him that she might kill al-Banna as he targeted her family and had captured, tortured and raped her in France in 2003. Kipper tries to convince her otherwise, but she turns him down.

In New York City, Jules and Rhino are ambushed by Mexican drug cartel shooters who work for Henry Cesky, the construction magnate who is close with the Kipper Administration; Jules had kicked Cesky off the Aussie Rules in Acapulco, Mexico after the Wave. As revenge, Cesky posed as the "Client" and duped them into grabbing the papers, which are located in the same building as the Emir's headquarters. Shortly before they are overrun, Caitlin liberates the Emir's harem (which is full of American women) and then kills Cesky's men and saves Jules and Rhino. The three of them infiltrate the Emir's building, where Jules finds papers implicating al-Banna and Cesky working together.

Milosz, Wilson and Gardener are caught in an ambush by irregulars led by Yusuf; in order to break the ambush, Milosz uses steel buckets and Claymores to form a shaped charge, which explodes and kills everyone, including Yusuf. Lieutenant Cleaver from the 82nd Airborne Division arrives and asks Milosz to verify the identity of Jules and Rhino, because they have papers that S-2 needs to forward to the NIA; against Wilson's will, Milosz verifies them and the 82nd Airborne Division sends a Blackhawk to pick up the two salvagers, because B-52 bombers from the 2nd Bomb Wing are on their way to fire bomb the Emir's compound at Rockefeller Center. Soon after, the two Rangers and the Air Force CCT are sent to use laser designators to mark Rockefeller Center.

Kipper is running with U.S. Army Rangers in Kansas City when he is called by Lieutenant Colonel Kinninmore; Kinninmore gives him information that the irregulars are using bridges in and around Manhattan to get fighters into the city. Kipper gives the order to destroy all the bridges; Governor Elliot Schimmel, the governor of New York, is on the army fort at Governors Island when the artillery opens up; MLRS and 155mm batteries destroy every bridge in New York City, much to Schimmel's dismay. Trapped on the island, the irregulars pool around the Emir's compound at Rockefeller Center, which is now designated by Wilson, Milosz and Gardener. Kinninmore links up with that team as 1/7 Cav fights through the streets; before the bombers arrive on station, the troops pull back to give the kill zone a wide berth.

In Texas, the Pieraro group are herding their cattle through a valley when a rain and thunder storm catches them in the open; despite all their efforts, some of the Mormons and most of their cattle are washed away in a flash flood.

The B-52s arrive on station; Milosz and Gardener target the Rockefeller Center as Lieutenant Colonel Kinninmore and the ground forces pull back. The incendiary bombs destroy Rockefeller Center and kill hundreds of fighters instantly; the surviving elements surrender en masse to the U.S. military, including the Russian and Serbian mafiosos. The Emir is believed dead, but Caitlin and Rhino and Jules are pulled out by helicopter; Caitlin is upset as she had to let the Emir go. On their way out, they see A-10 Warthogs and AH-64 Apaches assaulting Central Park.

Pieraro and Sofia find that while they survived, many of their friends are dead; as they are recovering from the flash flood, they learn that they have crossed into Oklahoma, and are now safe from the road agents in Texas. They head on to Kansas City, and to a new life of peace, while the U.S. military reclaims New York City and the pirate hold on the East Coast slips. The enemy flee the U.S. in droves.

References

External links

2010 Australian novels
2010 science fiction novels
Australian alternative history novels
Macmillan Publishers books
Novels set in fictional wars
Novels about the Russian Mafia
Novels about the Serbian Mafia